Jack Napier, also known as the Joker, is a fictional character introduced in the 1989 superhero film Batman, directed by Tim Burton. Primarily portrayed by Jack Nicholson, the character was based on the DC Comics supervillain the Joker. His name is a play on the word Jackanapes, as well as a reference to the names Jack Nicholson and Alan Napier, the latter having portrayed Alfred Pennyworth in the 1960s Batman TV series. This depiction is notable for being one of the first adaptations of the character to have a distinct first and last name, as well as one of the few instances which show his origins. This iteration of the Joker is a psychopathic mobster who serves as the right-hand man of Gotham City crime boss Carl Grissom, until the latter attempts to have him killed.

Ever since Nicholson's portrayal in the film, the name Jack Napier has been used by various adaptations of the character, including Batman: The Animated Series and Batwoman, in which he is respectively voiced and portrayed by Mark Hamill and Nathan Dashwood, and the Murphyverse. This interpretation of the character is also responsible for the deaths of Thomas and Martha Wayne, the parents of Batman's alter-ego Bruce Wayne in Batman.

Fictional character biography

Early life
Even as a child, Jack Napier was psychologically unstable, but extremely intelligent, showing an advanced knowledge of chemistry, art and science; he was also in and out of juvenile detention facilities for crimes such as arson, assault, and grand theft auto. Napier was charged with assault with a deadly weapon at age 15.

As a young man, Napier and his accomplice Joe Chill rob and murder Thomas and Martha Wayne in the alleyway behind the Monarch Theatre, leaving their young son Bruce as the only survivor. Napier prepares to kill Bruce as well, saying to the boy, "Have you ever danced with the devil by the pale moon light?" - his favorite thing to say right before killing someone. Chill entreats him to run before the police arrive, however, so Napier spares Bruce and leaves, saying in passing, "See ya around, kid."

Becoming the Joker

Years later, Napier moves up in the ranks of the Gotham City mafia, eventually becoming the right-hand-man of crime boss Carl Grissom (Jack Palance). He carries a deck of playing cards pierced from front to back by an earlier gunshot, and often performs sleight-of-hand with them or tosses them into his hat during idle moments. Napier privately dislikes Grissom, dismissing him as a "tired old man", and carries on an affair with his boss' moll Alicia Hunt (Jerry Hall). Grissom finds out about the affair and sets him up to be killed by Lt. Max Eckhardt (William Hootkins), a Gotham City Police Department cop on his payroll. The killing is to occur at Axis Chemicals, one of the mob's front companies, where Grissom sends Napier under the pretense of stealing incriminating documents.

Gotham City Police Commissioner James Gordon (Pat Hingle) and the masked vigilante Batman (Michael Keaton) intervene separately, disrupting the theft. Napier kills Eckhardt and shoots at Batman, who deflects the bullet with one of his gauntlets so that it strikes a gauge, projecting glass shards into Napier's face. In pain, Napier stumbles and topples over a railing; Batman tries unsuccessfully to pull him up, and he falls into a vat of chemicals. He survives, but the chemicals turn his skin chalk-white, his lips red, and his hair green, while a botched attempt at plastic surgery leaves him with a permanent rictus grin. Driven insane by his reflection, Napier - now calling himself "Joker" - kills Grissom and takes over his criminal empire.

Styling himself as "The World’s First Fully-Functioning Homicidal Artist", Joker seeks revenge on Batman for his disfigurement and becomes obsessed with "outdoing" the Dark Knight, who he believes is stealing the spotlight from him. Aided by his right-hand man Bob (Tracey Walter), Joker massacres the rest of Grissom's associates at a press conference and begins poisoning cosmetic products with "Smylex", a chemical agent that causes its victims to laugh hysterically as they die, leaving their corpses with a permanent smile. He also turns Alicia into one of his "masterpieces" by disfiguring her face and drugging her into submission; she eventually commits suicide.

Joker also becomes obsessed with photographer Vicki Vale (Kim Basinger), and attacks her while she meets with her boyfriend, billionaire Bruce Wayne - Batman's alter ego. Believing Wayne to be harmless, Joker taunts him with his signature line and shoots him. Wayne survives due to a metal tray hidden under his jacket, and recognizes Napier as his parents' killer.

Downfall and death
Joker announces via television broadcast that he plans to give out $20 million at Gotham City's 200th anniversary parade, and challenges Batman to meet him there. Joker keeps his promise of giving away the money, before releasing an airborne toxic version of Smylex onto the crowd via parade floats, killing dozens of people. Batman arrives in the Batwing and removes the balloons before Joker uses a revolver with a custom 21-inch barrel to shoot the plane out of the sky, causing it to crash on the steps of the Gotham City Cathedral.

Joker kidnaps Vale and takes her to the roof of the cathedral, pursued by Batman. As they fight, each admits that he is responsible for the existence of the other after Joker remembers the alley murders and realizes that Batman is Wayne. Batman knocks Joker off the roof, but Joker pulls him and Vale after himself and leaves them dangling from a ledge. As Joker attempts to escape via helicopter, Batman fires a cable that ties a heavy stone gargoyle to his ankle. The gargoyle breaks free of its mounting, dragging Joker off the helicopter ladder and causing him to fall to his death. Gordon finds Joker's corpse, with an activated laugh-box in his pocket.

In Crisis on Infinite Earths, the reality Joker lived on is dubbed "Earth-89".

Production

Casting
Several actors were considered for the role of the Joker before Nicholson was cast. Robin Williams, Tim Curry, Willem Dafoe, Ray Liotta, David Bowie, and James Woods were all considered. Burton initially wanted to cast character actor John Glover (who would later appear in Batman & Robin as Dr. Jason Woodrue and work in Batman: The Animated Series as Riddler, and as Mr. Sivana in Shazam!). Burton also considered Brad Dourif; but ultimately the studio insisted on using a bankable movie star. John Lithgow met with Burton about the part, but during their discussion attempted to talk the budding director out of casting him, which would be something he would later regret. Lithgow was also director Joe Dante's first choice for the role of the Joker when he was attached to direct the film in the early 1980s. Jack Nicholson had been the studio's top choice since 1980. Jon Peters approached Nicholson as far back as 1986, during filming of The Witches of Eastwick. Peter Guber took Burton and Nicholson on a horseback riding excursion in Aspen to get the pair acquainted and convince him to take the role. Nicholson's contract featured an "off-the-clock" agreement, specifying the number of hours he could have off, and allowed him to take time off to attend Los Angeles Lakers home games.

Design
As a part of Nicholson's contract, he was allowed to have approval over the makeup designer to create the look of the character. Nicholson chose Nick Dudman as his makeup designer. Dudman used an acrylic-based makeup for the bleached white face. Dudman cited the scene in the art gallery where Napier gets splashed with water by Vicki Vale as being the most difficult effect to achieve. To create the smile, Dudman did a regular face cast of Nicholson with a relaxed face, then asked him to do another one while pulling the largest grin he could muster. Dudman attempted to sculpt a smile that was always there but would take full effect when Nicholson smiled in the makeup; he also worked to ensure that the prosthetics wouldn't dilute Nicholson's face.

The character's origin in the film of falling into a vat of chemicals was inspired by the then-recent graphic novel Batman: The Killing Joke, written by Alan Moore. However, certain elements of the character's origin were changed, including making him having been a gangster rather than a failed stand-up comedian, and cutting the Red Hood persona from the character. Napier is seen to have always been a criminal, having been responsible for the deaths of Thomas and Martha Wayne, rather than Joe Chill, who instead serves as his accomplice.

Planned return
In the cancelled fifth film in the series, titled Batman Unchained, Nicholson was intended to return as the character via hallucinations from Scarecrow's Fear Toxins. The character of Harley Quinn was also rumored to have been involved in the story, and this adaptation was supposed to be the character's daughter, rather than girlfriend, who was seeking revenge on Batman for the death of her father. However, due to the critical and commercial failure of Batman & Robin, the project was scrapped.

The Batman series would be rebooted in 2005 by director Christopher Nolan with Batman Begins. The sequel to the film, The Dark Knight, featured the Joker portrayed by actor Heath Ledger. Ledger died before the film's release, and won the Academy Award for Best Supporting Actor posthumously. Nicholson was among many who praised Ledger's performance.

In other media
 Batman: The Animated Series, which was partially modeled after the 1989 film, implies that Jack Napier, could be either an alias or Joker's actual name as seen in the episode "Joker's Wild". The New Batman Adventures episode "Beware the Creeper" also hints at the same possibility when reporter Jack Ryder is at Ace Chemicals during the seventh year anniversary of Joker's birth at Ace Chemicals giving an account of his history.
 The Joker appears, portrayed by Curtis Armstrong, in one of several OnStar commercials from 2000 that are established to take place within the 1989 continuity. 
 The design of the character was also used as an inspiration for Jeremiah Valeska, portrayed by Cameron Monaghan on the television series Gotham up until the series finale episode "The Beginning...".
 The Jack Napier version of Joker is featured in the TV series set in the Arrowverse portrayed by Nathan Dashwood.
 In the Arrowverse television crossover "Crisis on Infinite Earths", the setting of Batman and its sequel Batman Returns is established to exist on a parallel Earth to the Arrowverse series. During the first part of the crossover, it is stated on the headline of a newspaper read by Alexander Knox that "Batman Captures Joker" despite the latter supposedly having been dead for years since the film's events, implying that someone may have succeeded Napier as the Joker. Arrowverse co-developer Marc Guggenheim stated that this apparent continuity error was intentional by the showrunners, as they imagine that in the interim between Batman '89 and "Crisis on Infinite Earths", Napier was either replaced by an impersonator or somehow was brought back to life.
 In the pilot episode of Batwoman, Joker was responsible for the bus hijacking that was responsible for running Gabi Kane's car off the bridge despite Batman's attempt to save them. In the episode "I'll Be Judge, I'll Be Jury", a television news report makes a passing reference to Jack Napier as the real name of The Joker where he was prosecuted by assistant district attorney Angus Stanton. The episode "A Narrow Escape" implied that Joker died in battle against Batman. In the episode "Bat Girl Magic", an image on Kate Kane's salvaged cellphone shows a portrait that was defaced with Safiyah Sohail's name. Jacob Kane finds that the portrait was made by Jack Napier. The episode "A Lesson from Professor Pyg" revealed that Jada Jet's son Marquis was attacked in the head by Joker's joy buzzer during his bus hijacking which caused Marquis to develop sociopath tendencies similar to the Joker's. The episode "Broken Toys" revealed that Joker had a toymaker minion named Kiki Roulette (portrayed by Judy Reyes) who built Joker's joy buzzer as she allies with Marquis. In the episode "We're All Mad Here", Joker was finally seen when Marquis recaps his encounter with Joker and Alice recalls the hijacked bus running Gabi's car off the bridge. Marquis quoted to Alice that fate brought them together. In the season's climax, the same joy buzzer is used on Marquis' head to restore his sanity.
 In the comic book series Batman: White Knight, the Joker uses the name "Jack Napier" after regaining sanity.

Reception
Nicholson's portrayal as The Joker was acclaimed by fans and critics alike. For his performance as the character, Nicholson was nominated for the Golden Globe for Best Actor in a Musical or Comedy, but lost to Morgan Freeman in Driving Miss Daisy. Nicholson was also nominated for the BAFTA Award for Best Actor in a Supporting Role by the British Academy of Film and Television Arts but lost to Ray McAnally in My Left Foot. Nicholson's adaptation of the character was placed as the 45th best movie villain of all time on the American Film Institute's list of 100 Heroes and Villains; Michael Keaton's Batman placed as the 46th greatest hero on the same list.

Praises from future successors
Heath Ledger, who portrayed the character in Christopher Nolan's 2008 film The Dark Knight, has cited Nicholson's portrayal as an influence on his interpretation of the character: "This character was too good to turn down. And yes, it would be a crime to attempt to [step in or to] follow Jack Nicholson's footpath that he so heavily stands into my memory of The Joker. I mean, I adore what he did and him in general." Mark Hamill, who voiced the character in Batman: The Animated Series, as well as in the Batman: Arkham video game series, has also cited Nicholson's adaptation of the character as an influence, but was told by show producers to avoid using Nicholson's Joker as a direct source of inspiration.

Have you ever danced with the devil in the pale moonlight?
The character's quote "Have you ever danced with the devil in the pale moonlight?" has become synonymous with the character as well as one of the character's most iconic phrases. The quote was nominated for the American Film Institute's 100 Movie Quotes list, but did not make the list. The quote was the title track for the unreleased song written by Prince for his soundtrack for the film. The track, titled "Dance with the Devil", was cut by Prince due to the darker tone of the song not fitting in with the rest of the upbeat songs on the soundtrack. It was replaced at the last second with "Batdance". Throughout the music videos for the singles released from the album, Prince was dressed as an amalgam of Nicholson's Joker and Keaton's Batman in a persona he titled Gemini. Nicholson's Joker can be heard in soundbytes during songs like "Batdance" and "Partyman".

Legacy
Since the film's release, many different interpretations of the character of the Joker have featured Jack Napier as his real name.

Batman: The Animated Series
Two episodes of Batman: The Animated Series, which was first produced in 1992, gave the Joker's real name as Jack Napier: "Dreams in Darkness", which depicted Dr. Bartholomew citing Jack Napier, Harvey Dent and Pamela Isley as the real names of the Joker, Two-Face and Poison Ivy; and "Joker's Wild", where businessman Cameron Kaiser's dossier about the Joker contained criminal records with the name Jack Napier. In the sequel series, The New Batman Adventures, the Joker was shown to adopt a multitude of aliases, hinting that in the DC Animated Universe continuity, "Jack Napier" was merely one alias, a reference to the comics where the Joker's real name is unknown.

Batman: White Knight

Most notably, the alias was used in the comic series Batman: White Knight, where The Joker is seemingly cured of his insanity, and takes up the civilian name of Jack Napier.

Batwoman
The Jack Napier alias is also used in the first two seasons of Batwoman. The Joker is said to have been killed by Batman prior to the events of the first season, although it is believed by most people that he remains locked up in Arkham Asylum. Batman left Gotham sometime after, leaving his cousin Kate Kane to take on the mantle of Batwoman to protect Gotham in his place. In season two, it is discovered that Napier worked on a painting using intestinal blood from one of his victims as it is discovered that it contained the map to the island of Coryana where Jacob Kane suspects that Kate is being held prisoner. While the painting that Jacob took off a defeated Wolf Spider was a fake, the real one is in the possession of Safiyah Sohail's former minion Ocean. In the third season, the Joker (portrayed by Nathan Dashwood) is revealed to have been driving the bus which caused Kate and Beth Kane's accident. A young Marquis Jet (portrayed by Kendrick Jackson and later as an adult by Nick Creegan) attempted to stop him, but the Joker caused him brain damage by pressing a joy buzzer to his head, leading Marquis develop similar psychotic tendencies in the future. Marquis is eventually restored to sanity in the season's climax with the same joy buzzer.

References

External links

Action film villains
Batman (1989 film series)
Batman live-action film characters
DC Comics male supervillains
DC Comics scientists
Fictional artists
Fictional characters with disfigurements
Fictional chemists
Fictional clowns
Fictional crime bosses
Fictional kidnappers
Fictional mass murderers
Fictional gangsters
Fictional terrorists
Film characters introduced in 1989
Male film villains
Joker (character) in other media
Male characters in film
Characters created by Tim Burton
Film supervillains
Fictional rampage and spree killers